BankID is a personal electronic identification system in Norway, that is used for identification and signing. It is the banks in Norway that offer this service. The solution has been developed through BankID Samarbeidet, which is a collaboration between the Norwegian Financial Services Association and Norwegian Savings Banks Association (these organizations were later partially merged and are now called Finans Norge). BankID is a Public Key Infrastructure (PKI) solution, and has support for both authentication and signing. The solution consists of a central infrastructure operated by Nets (formerly Bankenes BetalingsSentral) and of several client versions in different forms.

There is a "softlocal" version, a "net-centric/bank-stored" version and a mobile version.

 The Softlocal version was never rolled out to customers, and was based on the certificate being available on the individual user's computer.
 The bank-stored version is the most widespread as of 2021.
 BankID on mobile is offered as of 2021 by all mobile operators in Norway.

The solution is based on qualified certificates self-declared at the Norwegian Communications Authority, in the same way as Buypass ID and Commfides.

Over 4.2 million Norwegians use BankID, mainly to access online services at Norwegian banks, but also in public services and ID-Porten. This means that BankID, together with MinID, is the most widespread electronic identity solution in Norway. BankID meets the highest security level, level 4.

There is also a Swedish version of BankID, although they are not related to each other.

References 

Identity documents
Banking in Norway